José Francisco Ramírez Pineda (born 10 July 1976) is a retired Honduran footballer.

He was nicknamed Pancho Ra' and was the biggest transfer in the Honduran league, at that time, when Marathón acquired him from Platense in 2006 for 1,6 million lempiras.

Club career
Ramírez started his career at Motagua where he started scoring goals and caught the eye of foreign clubs. In 2000, Ramírez and two teammates from Motagua, Reynaldo Clavasquín and Gustavo Fuentes, were transferred to Scottish Premier League club Dundee United. All three had their contracts cancelled within a few weeks, in Ramírez's case after only four minutes of first team action when he came in as a sub against Celtic on 21 October 2000.

He then returned to Motagua before a prolific spell at Platense and a less successful stint at Marathón. In October 2003 he scored his 50th league goal against Vida. When at Platense, Ramírez was top goalscorer of the 2005 Apertura season with 13 goals and, by May 2009, was the Honduran league's third top goalscorer of all time with 95 goals scored for 4 different teams.

He seemed to end his career at Salvadoran side Vista Hermosa and returned to Honduras in 2009 to drive tourists around in his hometown Amapala with a motorcycle taxi.

In January 2010 he moved abroad again to play for Nicaraguan side Walter Ferretti for whom he would score 10 goals.

International career
Ramírez made his debut for Honduras in a March 1999 UNCAF Nations Cup match against Belize and he immediately scored his first international goal when coming on as a sub for Christian Santamaría. He has earned a total of 18 caps, scoring 10 goals. He has represented his country in 4 FIFA World Cup qualification matches and played at the 1999 UNCAF Nations Cup, as well as at the 2005 CONCACAF Gold Cup.

His final international was a January friendly match against Ecuador.

International goals

References

External links

1976 births
Living people
People from Valle Department
Association football forwards
Honduran footballers
Honduras international footballers
2005 CONCACAF Gold Cup players
F.C. Motagua players
Dundee United F.C. players
Platense F.C. players
C.D. Marathón players
C.D.S. Vida players
C.D. Vista Hermosa footballers
C.D. Walter Ferretti players
Honduran expatriate footballers
Expatriate footballers in Scotland
Expatriate footballers in El Salvador
Expatriate footballers in Nicaragua
Honduran expatriate sportspeople in El Salvador
Honduran expatriate sportspeople in Nicaragua
Honduran expatriate sportspeople in Scotland
Liga Nacional de Fútbol Profesional de Honduras players
Scottish Premier League players